Povl Falk-Jensen (26 July 1920 – 25 April 2019), better known under the codename Eigil, was a fighter in the Danish resistance movement during the German occupation of Denmark of 1940–45. Falk-Jensen was a member of the resistance group Holger Danske and the leader of the sub-group Eigil. Falk-Jensen was responsible for eleven executions of informers or collaborators and wrote his memoir entitled Holger Danske - Afdeling Eigils sabotager og stikkerlikvideringer under Besættelsen.

References

External links 
 Interview with Povl Falk-Jensen
 Interview with Povl Falk-Jensen
 Povl Falk-Jensen's memoir 

1920 births
2019 deaths
Danish resistance members
20th-century Danish memoirists